Daniel Schulz (born 21 February 1986 in Berlin) is a retired German footballer who currently works as a youth coach at Union Berlin.

References

External links

1986 births
Living people
German footballers
1. FC Union Berlin players
SV Sandhausen players
Stuttgarter Kickers players
Germany under-21 international footballers
2. Bundesliga players
3. Liga players
Regionalliga players
Footballers from Berlin
Association football defenders
FC Viktoria 1889 Berlin players